The 1986 Saskatchewan general election was held on October 20, 1986, to elect members of the Legislative Assembly of Saskatchewan.

The Progressive Conservative government of Premier Grant Devine was returned for a second term with a reduced majority in the legislature.

While the New Democratic Party managed to increase its share of the popular vote and significantly increase its presence in the legislature, former Premier Allan Blakeney's attempt to return to power was unsuccessful. Despite winning slightly more votes than the Tories, most of the NDP margin was wasted on landslide margins in Regina and Saskatoon.  While the NDP won eight seats in Regina and eight seats in Saskatoon, they only won nine seats in the rest of the province.  As a result, they were consigned to Official Opposition status for another term.

The Liberal Party captured almost 10% of the popular vote, but elected only one member – party leader Ralph Goodale – to the legislature. The party's vote was spread out across the province, and was not concentrated in enough areas to translate into more seats.

Results

|- bgcolor=CCCCCC
!rowspan=2 colspan=2 align=center|Party
!rowspan=2 align=center|Party leader
!rowspan=2|Candidates
!colspan=4 align=center|Seats
!colspan=3 align=center|Popular vote
|- bgcolor=CCCCCC
|align="center"|1982
|align="center"|Dissol.
|align="center"|Elected
|align="center"|% Change
|align="center"|#
|align="center"|%
|align="center"|% Change

|align="center"|Grant Devine
|align="right"|64
|align="right"|55
|align="right"|54
|align="right"| 38
|align="right"|-29.6%
|align="right"|244,382
|align="right"|44.60%
|align="right"|-9.45%

|align="center"|Allan Blakeney
|align="right"|64
|align="right"|9
|align="right"|8
|align="right"| 25
|align="right"|+212.5%
|align="right"|244,454
|align="right"|44.61%
|align="right"|+6.97%

|align="center"|Ralph Goodale
|align="right"| 64
|align="right"|–
|align="right"|–
|align="right"| 1
|align="right"|
|align="right"|57,968
|align="right"|10.58%
|align="right"|+6.07%

|align="center"|Hilton J. Spencer(default)
|align="right"| 9
|align="right"|–
|align="right"|2
|align="right"| –
|align="right"|-100%
|align="right"|458
|align="right"|0.08%
|align="right"|-3.18%

| colspan=2 align=left|Independent
|align="right"| 3
|align="right"|–
|align="right"|–
|align="right"| –
|align="right"|–
|align="right"|358
|align="right"|0.07%
|align="right"|-0.23%

|align=left|Alliance
|align="center"|
|align="right"| 6
|align="right"|*
|align="right"|*
|align="right"| –
|align="right"|*
|align="right"|237
|align="right"|0.04%
|align="right"|*  

|align="center"|
|align="right"| 1
|align="right"|*
|align="right"|*
|align="right"| –
|align="right"|*
|align="right"|73
|align="right"|0.01%
|align="right"|*
|-
|colspan=3| Total
|align="right"| 211
|align="right"|64
|align="right"|64
|align="right"| 64
|align="right"|–
|align="right"|547,930
|align="right"|100%
|align="right"| 
|-
| align="center" colspan=11|Source: Elections Saskatchewan
|-

Note: * Party did not nominate candidates in previous election.

Percentages

Ranking

Riding results
Names in bold represent cabinet ministers and the Speaker. Party leaders are italicized. The symbol " ** " indicates MLAs who are not running again.

Northwest Saskatchewan

Northeast Saskatchewan

West Central Saskatchewan

East Central Saskatchewan

Southwest Saskatchewan

|-

|style="width: 130px"|Prog. Conservative
|John Thomas Wolfe
|align="right"|3,164
|align="right"|44.31
|align="right"|+15.59

|NDP
|Allen Engel
|align="right"|3,009
|align="right"|42.14
|align="right"|+11.88

|Liberal
|Daryl Beatty
|align="right"|966
|align="right"|13.53
|align="right"|-27.48
|- bgcolor="white"
!align="left" colspan=3|Total
!align="right"|7,139
!align="right"|100.00
!align="right"|

Southeast Saskatchewan

Saskatoon

|-

|style="width: 130px"|NDP
|Bob Pringle
|align="right"|6,685
|align="right"|53.53
|align="right"|+14.59

|Prog. Conservative
|Toni Davidson
|align="right"|3,330
|align="right"|26.67
|align="right"|-16.41

|Liberal
|Pat Beck
|align="right"|2,473
|align="right"|19.80
|align="right"|+1.82
|- bgcolor="white"
!align="left" colspan=3|Total
!align="right"|12,488
!align="right"|100.00
!align="right"|

Regina

|-

|style="width: 130px"|NDP
|Dwain Lingenfelter
|align="right"|4,309
|align="right"|77.33
|align="right"|+6.43

|Prog. Conservative
|Myrna Petersen
|align="right"|694
|align="right"|12.46
|align="right"|-10.04

|Liberal
|Ron Eistetter
|align="right"|569
|align="right"|10.21
|align="right"|+3.61
|- bgcolor="white"
!align="left" colspan=3|Total
!align="right"|5,572
!align="right"|100.00
!align="right"|

See also
List of political parties in Saskatchewan
List of Saskatchewan provincial electoral districts

References

Elections Saskatchewan
Saskatchewan Archives Board - Election Results By Electoral Division

Further reading
 

Saskatchewan general election 
General election
1986
Saskatchewan general election